Kirill Sokolov (27 September 1930 – 22 May 2004) was a Russian painter, sculptor, print-maker and stage designer. Name in Russian: Кирилл Соколов.

Throughout his career, Kirill Sokolov's work and art enjoyed a wide range of media and art forms, from books illustrations and silk-screen printing to oil painting, collage and sculpture.

Between 1950 and 1957 Sokolov studied at the Surikov Institute in Moscow. Amongst his classmates was the future conceptual artist Ilya Kabakov. In 1960 Sokolov met his future wife, Avril Pyman, a British research student and biographer of Alexander Blok. The couple married in Moscow in 1963. For the next ten years Sokolov gained distinction as a highly original engraver and illustrator of some fifty books, including the works of Mikhail Bulgakov and Yuri Trifonov.

In 1974 Sokolov moved to the United Kingdom from where he established an international reputation. Living first in Berwick-upon-Tweed and then Durham, the artist served as co-editor of the international art journal Leonardo as well as becoming a member of the Society of Graphic Fine Art.

During his career, Sokolov developed his own method of printmaking which he called 'silkscreen collage', the results of which include a tribute to George Orwell, London 1984, and have been exhibited widely.

References

External links
 
 Biographical timeline of the life and work of Kirill Sokolov

Russian artists
1930 births
2004 deaths